Arganza is a town and one of 44 civil parishes in Tineo, a municipality within the province and autonomous community of Asturias in northern Spain.

The Church of Santa Maria of Arganza, built in 1992, sank and collapsed on 2 September 2007.

References

Parishes in Tineo